Ahmed III (Aḥmed-i sālis) (30 December 16731 July 1736) was Sultan of the Ottoman Empire and a son of Sultan Mehmed IV (r. 1648–1687). His mother was Gülnuş Sultan, originally named Evmania Voria, who was an ethnic Greek. He was born at Hacıoğlu Pazarcık, in Dobruja. He succeeded to the throne in 1703 on the abdication of his brother Mustafa II (1695–1703). Nevşehirli Damat İbrahim Pasha and the Sultan's daughter, Fatma Sultan (wife of the former) directed the government from 1718 to 1730, a period referred to as the Tulip Era.

The first days of Ahmed III's reign passed with efforts to appease the janissaries who were completely disciplined.  However, he was not effective against the janissaries who made him sultan. Çorlulu Ali Pasha, who Ahmed brought to the Grand Vizier, tried to help him in administrative matters, made new arrangements for the treasury and Sultan.  He supported Ahmed in his fight with his rivals.

Early life and education
Sultan Ahmed was born on 30 December 1673. His father was Sultan Mehmed IV, and his mother was Gülnuş Sultan, originally named Evmenia. His birth occurred in Hacıoğlupazarı, where Mehmed stayed to hunt on his return from Poland in 1673, while Gülnuş was pregnant at that time. In 1675, He and his brother, Prince Mustafa (future Mustafa II) were circumcised. During the same ceremony their sisters Hatice Sultan and Fatma Sultan were married to Musahip Mustafa Pasha and Kara Mustafa Pasha respectively. The celebrations lasted 20 days.

He grew up in the Edirne Palace. His schooling began during one of the sporadic visits of the court to Istanbul, following a courtly ceremony called bad-i basmala, which took place on 9 August 1679 in the Istavroz Palace. He was brought up in the imperial harem in Edirne with a traditional princely education, studying the Qur’an, the hadiths (traditions of Prophet Muhammad), and the fundamentals of Islamic sciences, history, poetry and music under the supervision of private tutors. One of his tutors was chief mufti Feyzullah Efendi.

Ahmed was apparently curious and intellectual in nature, spending most of his time reading and practising calligraphy. The poems that he wrote manifest his profound knowledge of poetry, history, Islamic theology and philosophy. He was also interested in calligraphy, which he had studied with the leading court calligraphers, primarily with Hafız
Osman Efendi (died 1698), who influenced his art immensely, and, therefore, practiced it because of the influence of his elder brother, the future Sultan Mustafa II, who also became a notable calligrapher.

During his princehood in Edirne, Ahmed made friends
with a bright officer-scribe, Ibrahim, from the city of Nevşehir, who was to become one of the outstanding Grand Viziers of his future reign. From 1687, following the deposition of his father, he lived in isolation for sixteen years in the palaces of Edirne and Istanbul. During this period he dedicated 
himself to calligraphy and intellectual activities.

Reign

Accession

The Edirne succession occurred between 19 August to 23 August. Under Mustafa, Istanbul had been out of control for a long time.  As arrests and executions mounted, theft and robbery incidents became common. The people were dissatisfied with the poor governing of the Empire.  Mustafa was deposed by the Janissaries and Ahmed, who succeeded him to the throne on 22 August 1703. The first Friday salute was held in Bayezid Mosque.

Fındıklılı Mehmed Ağa welcomed the new sultan at the Harem gate on the Hasoda side, entered the arm, brought him to the Cardigan-i Saadet Department and placed them on the throne, and were among the first to pay tribute to him. 

As part of the fief system, Ahmed reorganized the land law in 1705. Bringing order to land ownership reduced the crime wave and brought peace to the troubled Empire. Due to his ardent support of the new laws, Ahmed was given the title 'law-giver', a title given to only three sultans earlier, Bayezid II (r.1481-1512), Selim I (r.1512-1520) and Suleyman the Magnificent (r.1520-1566). In the first three years of his reign, Ahmed appointed four separate Grand Viziers. However, the government only gained stability after the appointment of Çorlulu Ali Pasha in May 1706.

Russo-Turkish War of 1710–11

Ahmed III cultivated good relations with France, doubtless in view of Russia's menacing attitude. He afforded refuge in Ottoman territory to Charles XII of Sweden (1682–1718) after the Swedish defeat at the hands of Peter I of Russia (1672–1725) in the Battle of Poltava of 1709. In 1710 Charles XII convinced Sultan Ahmed III to declare war against Russia, and the Ottoman forces under Baltacı Mehmet Pasha won a major victory at the Battle of Prut. In the aftermath, Russia returned Azov back to the Ottomans, agreed to demolish the fortress of Taganrog and others in the area, and to stop interfering in the affairs of the Polish–Lithuanian Commonwealth.

Forced against his will into war with Russia, Ahmed III came nearer than any Ottoman sovereign before or since to breaking the power of his northern rival, whose armies his grand vizier Nevşehirli Damat İbrahim Pasha succeeded in completely surrounding at the Pruth River Campaign in 1711. The subsequent Ottoman victories against Russia enabled the Ottoman Empire to advance to Moscow, had the Sultan wished. However, this was halted as a report reached Istanbul that the Safavids were invading the Ottoman Empire, causing a period of panic, turning the Sultan's attention away from Russia.

Wars with Venice and Austria

On 9 December 1714, war was declared on Venice, and an army under Silahdar Damat Ali Pasha's command,  the Ottomans managed to recover the whole Morea (Peloponnese) from Venice through coordinated operations of the army and navy.

This success alarmed Austria and in April 1716, Emperor Charles VI provoked the Porte into a declaration of war. The unsuccessful battle, also 
commanded by Silahdar Ali Pasha, ended with the treaty of Passarovitz, signed on 21 July 1718, according to which Belgrade, Banat, and little Wallachia were ceded to Austria. This failure was a real disappointment for Ahmed and after the bad conditions imposed by this treaty, Istanbul's economy suffered from increased inflation and all of its attendant evils.

Ibrahim Pasha who was the second leading figure of the empire after Ahmed had joined the Morea campaign in 1715, and was appointed as the city of Nish's minister of finance the following year. This post helped him realize the downturn of the state's finances and, due to his insight of this sensitive financial situation he avoided war as much as possible during his vizierate. Ibrahim Pasha's policy of peace suited Ahmed as well since he had no wish to lead any military campaigns, in addition to the fact that his interest in art and culture made him reluctant to leave his Istanbul.

Character of Ahmed's rule
While shooting competitions were held in Okmeydanı with the idea of increasing the morale of the soldiers and the people, a new warship was launched in Tersane-i Amir.  He tried three grand viziers at short intervals.  Instead of Hasan Pasha, he appointed Kalaylikoz Ahmed Pasha on 24 September 1704, and Baltacı Mehmed Pasha on 25 December 1704.  It was a great pleasure that the ambassadors of Iran and Austria, who came from 1706 to 1707.  In 1707, the conspiracy led by Eyüplü Ali Ağa was unearthed to bring the sultan off the throne.  Necks were cut in front of the Bab-I-Hümayun. Ahmed III left the finances of the Ottoman Empire in a flourishing condition, which had remarkably been obtained without excessive taxation or extortion procedures. He was a cultivated patron of literature and art, and it was in his time that the first printing press authorized to use the Arabic or Turkish languages was set up in Istanbul, operated by Ibrahim Muteferrika (while the printing press had been introduced to Constantinople in 1480, all works published before 1729 were in Greek, Armenian, or Hebrew).

It was in this reign that an important change in the government of the Danubian Principalities was introduced: previously, the Porte had appointed Hospodars, usually native Moldavian and Wallachian boyars, to administer those provinces; after the Russian campaign of 1711, during which Peter the Great found an ally in Moldavia Prince Dimitrie Cantemir, the Porte began overtly deputizing Phanariote Greeks in that region, and extended the system to Wallachia after Prince Stefan Cantacuzino established links with Eugene of Savoy. The Phanariotes constituted a kind of Dhimmi nobility, which supplied the Porte with functionaries in many important departments of the state.

Relations with the Mughal Empire

Jahandar Shah
In the year 1712, the Mughal Emperor Jahandar Shah, the grandson of Aurangzeb sent gifts to the Ottoman Sultan Ahmed III and referred to himself as the Ottoman Sultan's devoted admirer.

Farrukhsiyar
The Mughal Emperor Farrukhsiyar a grandson of Aurangzeb, is also known to have sent a letter to the Ottomans but this time it was received by the Grand Vizier Nevşehirli Damad Ibrahim Pasha providing a graphic description of the efforts of the Mughal commander Syed Hassan Ali Khan Barha against the Rajput and Maratha rebellion.

Deposition

Sultan Ahmed III had become unpopular by reason of the excessive pomp and costly luxury in which he and his principal officers indulged; on 20 September 1730, a mutinous riot of seventeen Janissaries, led by the Albanian Patrona Halil, was aided by the citizens as well as the military until it swelled into an insurrection in front of which the Sultan was forced to give up the throne.

Ahmed voluntarily led his nephew Mahmud I (1730–54) to the seat of sovereignty and paid allegiance to him as Sultan of the Empire. He then retired to the Kafes previously occupied by Mahmud and died at Topkapı Palace after six years of confinement.

Architecture
Ahmed III built water claps, fountain and park waterfalls. Ahmed, who built three libraries, one inside the Topkapı Palace, and one of the famous lines of his period.  Ahmed was a master in the writings on plates.  Some plates and inscriptions have survived.  The “Basmala” at the Topkapi Palace apartment door with its plates in the 
Üsküdar Yeni Mosque are among them.

Topkapı Palace and its buildings have been the subject of many researches and publications.  Among these researches, many different scope studies are also noticed together with postgraduate theses.  Consequently, they provide rich information about the palace, which provides a long list of highly qualified scientific articles and books, guides and brochures promoting the palace and museum.  However, Topkapi Palace and its units still have aspects to be explored and details to be discussed.  Among them Ahmed III library can also be counted. 

A library was built by Ahmed in 1724–25 to the right of the porch in front of the tomb.  The structure, which has stone-brick alternate meshed walls, is square-shaped and covered with a flattened dome with an octagonal rim, which is provided with pendants.  There are original pen works left in the pendants and dome of the library.

Disasters

In 1714, an Egyptian galleon standing near the Gümrük (Eminönü) Pier caught fire and burned, and two hundred people died.

Fire of 1718
While Nevşehirli Damat Ibrahim Pasha continued his preparations for return to Istanbul, a fire broke out in Istanbul.  Unkapanı, Azapkapı, Zeyrek, Fatih, Saraçhane, Horhor, Etmeydanı, Molla Gürani, Altımermer, Ayazma Gate, Kantarcılar, Vefa, Vez Neciler, Old Rooms, Acemioğlanlar Barracks, Çukur Çeşme, Langa, Davudpaşa districts were burned from the fire.

Earthquake of 1719
However, this festivity went astringent as it came just after the three-minute big earthquake on 14 May 1719. While the city walls of Istanbul were destroyed in the earthquake, 4000 people died in Izmit and Yalova was destroyed.  After the earthquake, reconstruction work started in Istanbul. The most meaningful element that reflects the cultural aspect or weight of these works until today is the Topkapı Palace Enderun Library, which was built that year. A rich foundation was established for this institution, which is also known as Sultan Ahmed-i Salis Library, which has a face-to-face with its architectural and valuable manuscripts.

Family 
Ahmed III is known to be the Sultan with the largest family of the Ottoman dynasty. The hostess of his harem was Dilhayat Kalfa, known to be one of the greatest Turkish composeress of the early modern period.

Consorts 
Ahmed III had at least twenty-one consorts: 
 Emetullah Kadın. Baş Kadin (first consort) and her first concubine, she was the mother of the firstborn, Fatma Sultan, the Ahmed's favorite daughter. She was Ahmed's most beloved consort, who dedicated a mosque, a school and a fountain to her. Very devoted and active in charity, she died in 1740 in the Old Palace.
 Mihrişah Emine Kadın. She was the mother of four sons including Mustafa III, 26th Sultan of the Ottoman Empire, but she premorted at her son's rise and therefore was never Valide sultan. She died in April 1732. Her son built the Ayazma Mosque in her honor in Üsküdar.
 Rabia Şermi Kadın. She was the mother of Abdülhamid I, 27th Sultan of the Ottoman Empire, but she premorted at the rise of her son and therefore was never Valide Sultan. In 1728, a fountain was dedicated to her in Üsküdar. She died in 1732. Her son built the Beylerbeyi Mosque in her honor.  
 Ayşe Mihri Behri Kadın. Before she became a consort, she was treasurer of the harem.
 Hatem Kadın. Mother of twins, she died in 1772 and was buried in Eyüp cemetery.
 Musli Emine Kadın. Also called Muslıhe Kadın, Muslu Kadin or Musalli Kadın. She mother of two daughters, she died in 1750 and was buried with them in the Yeni Cami.
 Rukiye Kadın. Mother of a daughter and a son, she built a fountain near the Yeni Cami. She died after 1738 and was buried with her daughter in the Yeni Cami.
 Fatma Hümaşah Kadın. She died in 1732 and was buried by the Yeni Cami.
 Gülneş Kadın. Also called Gülnuş Kadın. She is listed in a document naming her consorts exiled to Old Palace after the deposition of Ahmed III whose jewels were confiscated. She died after 1730.
 Hürrem Kadın. Listed in a document that names the consorts exiled to Old Palace after the deposition of Ahmed III whose jewels were confiscated. She died after 1730.
 Meyli Kadın. Listed in a document that names the consorts exiled to Old Palace after the deposition of Ahmed III whose jewels were confiscated. She died after 1730.
 Hatice Kadın. She died in 1722 and was buried in the Yeni Cami.
 Nazife Kadın. Listed in a document that names the consorts exiled to Old Palace after the deposition of Ahmed III whose jewels were confiscated. She died after 1730, perphaps the 29 December 1764.
 Nejat Kadın. Listed in a document that names the consorts exiled to Old Palace after the deposition of Ahmed III whose jewels were confiscated. She died after 1730.
 Sadık Kadın. Also called Sadıka Kadin. Listed in a document that names the consorts exiled to Old Palace after the deposition of Ahmed III whose jewels were confiscated. She died after 1730.
 Hüsnüşah Kadın. She died in 1733 and was buried in the Yeni Cami.
 Şahin Kadın. She died in 1732 and was buried in the Yeni Cami.
 Ümmügülsüm Kadın. She died in 1768 and was buried in the Yeni Cami.
 Zeyneb Kadın. Mother of a daughter, she died in 1757 and was buried by the Yeni Cami.
 Hanife Kadın. Mother of a daughter, she died in 1750 and was buried in the Yeni Cami.
 Şayeste Hanim. BaşIkbal. She died in 1722 and was buried by the Yeni Cami.

Sons 
Ahmed III had at least twenty-one sons, all buried, apart from the two who became Sultans, in the Yeni Cami:
 Şehzade Mehmed (24 November 1705 - 30 July 1706).
 Şehzade Isa (23 February 1706 - 14 May 1706).
 Şehzade Ali (18 June 1706 - 12 September 1706).
 Şehzade Selim (29 August 1706 - 15 April 1708).
 Şehzade Murad (17 November 1707 - 1707).
 Şehzade Murad (25 January 1708 - 1 April 1708).
 Şehzade Abdülmecid (12 December 1709 - 18 March 1710). Twin of Şehzade Abdülmelek.
 Şehzade Abdülmelek (12 December 1709 - 7 March 1711). Twin of Şehzade Abdülmecid.
 Şehzade Süleyman (25 August 1710 - 11 October 1732) - with Mihrişah Kadin. He died in the Kafes after two years of imprisonment.
 Şehzade Mehmed (8 October 1712 - 15 July 1713).
 Şehzade Selim (21 March 1715 - February 1718) - with Hatem Kadın. Twin of Saliha Sultan.
 Şehzade Mehmed (2 January 1717 - 2 January 1756) - with Rukiye Kadın. He died in the Kafes after twenty-six years of imprisonment.
 Mustafa III (28 January 1717 - 21 January 1774) - with Mihrişah Kadin. He was the 26th Sultan of the Ottoman Empire after twenty-seven years of imprisonment in the Kafes. 
 Şehzade Bayezid (4 October 1718 - 24 January 1771) - with Mihrişah Kadin. He died in the Kafes after forty-one years of imprisonment.
 Şehzade Abdüllah (18 December 1719 - 19 December 1719).
 Şehzade Ibrahim (12 September 1720 - 16 March 1721).
 Şehzade Numan (22 February 1723 - 29 December 1764). He died in the Kafes after thirthy-four years of imprisonment.
 Abdülhamid I (20 March 1725 - 7 April 1789) - with Rabia Şermi Kadın. He was the 27th Sultan of the Ottoman Empire after forty-four years of imprisonment in the Kafes. 
 Şehzade Seyfeddin (3 February 1728 - 1732) - with Mihrişah Kadin. He died in the Kafes after two years of imprisonment.
 Şehzade Mahmud (? - 22 December 1756). He died in the Kafes after twenty-six years of imprisonment.
 Şehzade Hasan (? - ?). He probably died in the Kafes.

Daughters 
Ahmed III had at least thirty-six daughters:
 Fatma Sultan (22 September 1704 - May 1733) - with Emetullah Kadın. She was her father's favorite daughter. She married twice and had two sons and two daughters. She and her second husband were the real power during the Tulip Era. She fell from grace after the Patrona Halil revolt and was confined to Çırağan Palace, where she died three years later.
 Hatice Sultan (21 January 1701 - 29 August 1707). Buried in the mausoleum Turhan Sultan in the Yeni Cami.
 Ayşe Sultan (? - 1706). Buried in the Yeni Cami.
 Mihrimah Sultan (17 June 1706 - ?). She died as a child and was buried in the Yeni Cami.
 Rukiye Sultan (3 March 1707 - 29 August 1707). She was buried in the Yeni Cami.
 Ümmügülsüm Sultan (11 February 1708 - 28 November 1732). Twin of Zeynep Sultan. She married once and had four sons and a daughter.
 Zeynep Sultan (11 February 1708 - 5 November 1708). Twin sister of Ümmügülsüm Sultan. She was buried in the Yeni Cami.
 Zeynep Sultan (5 January 1710 - July 1710). She was buried in the Yeni Cami.
 Hatice Sultan (8 February 1710 - 1710, before September). She was buried in the Turhan Sultan mausoleum in Yeni Cami.
 Hatice Sultan (27 September 1710 - 1738) - with Rukiye Kadın. She married twice and had a son.
 Emine Sultan (1711 - 1720). She was buried in the Yeni Cami.
 Atike Sultan (29 February 1712 - 2 April 1737). She got married once and she had a son.
 Rukiye Sultan (7 March 1713 - October 1715). Buried in the Turhan Sultan mausoleum in Yeni Cami.
 Saliha Sultan (21 March 1715 - 11 October 1778) - with Hatem Kadın. Twin of Şehzade Selim. She was married five times and had a son and four daughters.
 Ayşe Sultan (10 October 1715 - 9 July 1775) - with Musli Kadın. Nicknamed Küçük Ayşe (meaning Ayşe the youngest) to distinguish her from her cousin Ayşe the eldest, daughter of Mustafa II. She married three times and had a daughter.
 Ferdane Sultan (? - 1718). She died as a child and she was buried in the Yeni Cami.
 Reyhane Sultan (1718 - 1729). Also called Reyhan Sultan or Rihane Sultan. She was buried in the Yeni Cami.
 Ümmüseleme Sultan (? - 1719). Also called Ümmüselma Sultan. She died as a child and was buried in the Yeni Cami.
 Rabia Sultan (19 November 1719 - before 1727). She was buried in the Yeni Cami.
 Emetullah Sultan (1719 - 1724) Also called Ümmetullah Sultan. She was buried in the Yeni Cami.
 Zeynep Asima Sultan (8 April 1720 - March 25, 1774). She married twice and she had a son. 
 Rukiye Sultan (? - 1720). She died as a child and was buried in the Yeni Cami.
 Beyhan Sultan (? - 1720). She died as a child and was buried in the Yeni Cami.
 Emetullah Sultan (17 September 1723 - 28 January 1724). She was buried in the Yeni Cami.
 Emine Sultan (late 1723/early 1724 - 1732). She was buried in the Yeni Cami.
 Nazife Sultan (May 1723/1725 - before 1730 or 29 December 1764). Exceptionally, she never married, most likely because she was chronically ill or had physical and/or mental problems. She lived in seclusion in the Old Palace all her life. However, according to other historians, she actually died a child and the Nazife who died in the Old Palace in 1764 was instead one of Ahmed III's consorts with the same name, Nazife Kadin.
 Ümmüselene Sultan (12 October 1724 - 5 December 1732). She was buried in the Yeni Cami.
 Naile Sultan (15 December 1725 - October 1727). She was buried in the Yeni Cami.
 Esma Sultan (14 March 1726 - 13 August 1778) - with Hanife Kadın or Zeyneb Kadın. Nicknamed Büyük Esma (meaning Esma the eldest) to distinguish her from her niece Esma the younger, daughter of Abdülhamid I. She married three times and had a daughter. 
 Sabiha Sultan (19 December 1726 - 17 December 1726). She was buried in the Yeni Cami.
 Rebia Sultan (28 October 1727 - 4 April 1728). Also called Rabia Sultan. She was buried in the Yeni Cami.
 Zübeyde Sultan (28 March 1728 - 4 June 1756) - with Musli Kadın. She married twice.
 Ümmi Sultan (? - 1729). Called also Ümmügülsüm Sultan. She was buried in the Yeni Cami.
 Ümmühabibe Sultan (? - 1730). She was buried in the Yeni Cami.
 Akile Sultan (? - 1737). She was buried in the Yeni Cami.
 Ümmi Sultan (1730 - 1742). Called also Ümmügülsüm Sultan. She was buried in the Yeni Cami.

Death
Ahmed lived in Kafes of the Topkapi Palace for six years following his deposition, where he fell ill and died on 1 July 1736. He was buried in his grandmother's tomb in Turhan Sultan Mausoleum in New Mosque, at Eminönü in Istanbul.

In fiction
In Voltaire's Candide, the eponymous main character meets the deposed Ahmed III on a ship from Venice to Constantinople. The Sultan is in the company of five other deposed European monarchs, and he tells Candide, who initially doubts his credentials:

I am not jesting, my name is Achmet III. For several years I was Sultan; I dethroned my brother; my nephew dethroned me; they cut off the heads of my viziers; I am ending my days in the old seraglio; my nephew, Sultan Mahmoud, sometimes allows me to travel for my health, and I have come to spend the Carnival at Venice." 

This episode was taken up by the modern Turkish writer Nedim Gürsel as the setting of his 2001 novel Le voyage de Candide à Istanbul.

In fact, there is no evidence of the deposed Sultan being allowed to make such foreign travels, nor did Voltaire (or Gürsel) assert that it had any actual historical foundation.

See also 
 Fountain of Ahmed III
 Fountain of Ahmed III (Üsküdar)
 Ibrahim Muteferrika
 Esma Sultan, daughter of Ahmed III

References

Sources
 This article incorporates text from the History of Ottoman Turks (1878)

External links 

People of Turkic descent
Turkish male poets
1673 births
1736 deaths
18th-century Ottoman sultans
Ottoman sultans born to Greek mothers
Turks from the Ottoman Empire
Dethroned monarchs